Rasim Fərzi oğlu Abuşev (born 15 October 1963) is a retired Azerbaijani professional footballer. He made his professional debut in 1985 for Ganclik Baku.

International career
For Azerbaijan, Abuşev is capped 40 times, scoring 3 goals. He made his national team debut on 25 May 1993 against Georgia in friendly match. He scored his first goal on 22 March 1997 against Turkmenistan in a friendly match.

International goals

References

1963 births
Soviet footballers
Azerbaijani expatriate footballers
Azerbaijani footballers
Azerbaijan international footballers
Living people
Qarabağ FK players
FC Dynamo Stavropol players
Footballers from Baku
Soviet Azerbaijani people

Association football midfielders
Neftçi PFK players